Hunanese may refer to:
 Hunanese people, people born or native in Hunan, China
 Hunan cuisine, one of the eight culinary traditions of Chinese cuisine, comes from Hunan Province
 Xiang Chinese or Hunanese, a branch of the Chinese language, spoken in Hunan Province

Language and nationality disambiguation pages